Wendell Smith Taylor (April 7, 1899 – October 6, 1987) was an American football player.  He was raised in Oklahoma, and, in June 1919, he was admitted to the United States Naval Academy.  At the Academy, he played at the end position for the Navy Midshipmen football team.  He was a consensus first-team selection to the 1922 College Football All-America Team. He also competed in track for the Naval Academy and has been inducted into the Navy Sports Hall of Fame.  In his later years, he lived in Cookson, Oklahoma.  He died in 1987 at the age of 88.

References

1899 births
1987 deaths
American football ends
Navy Midshipmen football players
All-American college football players
Players of American football from Oklahoma